Foreign Ministry of the Independent State of Croatia was a ministry of the Government of the Independent State of Croatia established on a provision on 24 June 1941. This provision also contained determinations of activity of this ministry.

Members of the ministry were chosen in 1941, while most of changes of membership occurred in 1943 with smaller changes in 1944.

Activity
The Foreign Ministry was assigned for all foreign affairs, establishment of agencies aboard, relationship with foreign countries, protection of Croatian interests and its citizens, collecting of political structure and its elaboration, collecting of print data, supervision of information offices, radio stations and press, supervision of the Report Office of the Ministry, tracking of the development of international law, cooperation at conclusion of international contracts, making powers for the signing of international treaties, saving of international contracts and documents, cultural cooperation with foreign countries, visa, international traffic and passengers, immigration and emigration, honor consulates and foreign consular representatives.  
Territorial jurisdiction of the Foreign Ministry also included Croatian consular offices aboard (embassies and consulates, general consulates, consular offices, social offices, trade delegations, etc.).

Foreign Ministers

References

Independent State of Croatia
Independent State of Croatia
Ministries established in 1941